Chown is a surname.  It may refer to:

People
 Samuel Dwight Chown (1853–1933), Methodist minister instrumental in the formation of the United Church of Canada
 Alice Amelia Chown (1866–1949), Canadian pacifist, social feminist and author
 Bruce Chown (1893–1986), Canadian scientist 
 Chris and Gunna Chown, co-owners of the Plas Bodegroes restaurant in Wales  
 Gordon Chown, member of Parliament for Winnipeg South, Manitoba, Canada, 1957–1963 
 Jeffrey Chown, American professor of communication studies at Northern Illinois University, biographer of director Francis Ford Coppola 
 Kevin Chown (born 1969), American musician, bassist for Chad Smith's Bombastic Meatbats and others 
 Marcus Chown (born 1959), British science writer and broadcaster 
 Nick Chown, bassist for the 1980s English music group The Bolshoi

Places
 Mount Chown, a mountain in Alberta, Canada
 Chown Creek, a tributary of the Smoky River in Western Alberta, Canada 
 Mackenzie Chown Complex at Brock University in Ontario, Canada

Others
 chown, a UNIX operating system command

See also
 Chowning